Akzhar is a district of North Kazakhstan Region in northern Kazakhstan. The administrative center of the district is the selo of Talshik. Population:

Geography
Lakes Ulken-Karoy and Kishi-Karoy are located in the district.

References

Districts of Kazakhstan
North Kazakhstan Region